Potter's Lock can refer to:

 Potter's Lock, Wiltshire, on the Kennet and Avon Canal
 Potter's Lock, Ilkeston, on the Erewash Canal